Ion Voicu (born 1 November 1975) is a Romanian former footballer who played as a right defender.

Honours
Rapid București
Divizia A: 1998–99, 2002–03
Cupa României: 2001–02
Supercupa României: 1999, 2002
Rocar București
Cupa României runner-up: 2000–01

References

1975 births
Living people
Romanian footballers
Romania under-21 international footballers
Association football defenders
Liga I players
Liga II players
Nemzeti Bajnokság I players
FC Gloria Buzău players
FC Dinamo București players
FCV Farul Constanța players
AFC Rocar București players
FC Rapid București players
CSM Unirea Alba Iulia players
CSM Jiul Petroșani players
FC Vaslui players
FCM Dunărea Galați players
Romanian expatriate footballers
Expatriate footballers in Hungary
Romanian expatriate sportspeople in Hungary
People from Drăgășani